Lake Elwell (a.k.a. Tiber Reservoir) is a reservoir in north central Montana.  The reservoir was created by the damming of the Marias River at the Tiber Dam.  Lake Elwell was named for Judge Charles B. Elwell (1888–1974), former director of the Montana Reclamation Association.

See also
 List of lakes in Montana
 List of lakes in Liberty County, Montana

References

Elwell
Bodies of water of Liberty County, Montana
Bodies of water of Toole County, Montana
Protected areas of Liberty County, Montana
Protected areas of Toole County, Montana
Montana articles lacking sources